S Club is the debut studio album by British pop group S Club 7. It was released by Polydor Records on 4 October 1999. The album was primarily produced by StarGate, Absolute, Dufflebag Boys, Eliot Kennedy and Mike Percy.

S Club became one of the group's most successful album releases, and reached number two in the United Kingdom, where it was certified double platinum. S Club was released in North America on 11 April 2000 after their television show S Club 7 in Miami was aired in the United States, where it peaked outside the top 100. In Canada, the album charted within the top 10 and became the group's most successful album release on the Canadian albums chart.

Background
S Club 7 first came to public attention in 1999, when they starred in their own television series, Miami 7. The show aired on CBBC on BBC One and was a children's sitcom based on the lives of the group who had moved to Miami, Florida in search of fame in America. The show was also launched in the United States, airing on Fox Family, and later on ABC Family; it was retitled S Club 7 in Miami for American audiences. The show eventually celebrated worldwide success and was watched by 90 million viewers in over 100 different countries. The group also filmed two specials between the first two series of their show. The first, Back to the '50s—which aired on CITV, instead of CBBC—told the story of how the group found themselves back in 1959. In the second TV special, Boyfriends & Birthdays, Stevens' boyfriend gave her an ultimatum of staying with him or remaining with the band.

Within the television series, and the parallel branding, each member of S Club 7 had their own character, which contained exaggerated forms of their real life counterparts as well as their own identifiable "S Club colour". Hannah Spearritt, for example, had an "S Club colour" of yellow which, as Spearritt describes, mirrors her own personality: "bright and happy". The show copied characterisations and format of the American series The Monkees; US media reported that S Club 7 were "The Monkees for the next generation". Joel Andryc, the vice president of the Fox Family Channel, stated that Miami 7 is "far more relationship driven" than The Monkees, and that "kids today are more sophisticated".

Following on from Miami 7, S Club 7 released the theme music to the show as their debut single on 9 June 1999. The up-tempo "Bring It All Back" reached number-one on the UK Singles Chart, and after selling more than 600,000 copies, was certified Platinum by the BPI. Commenting on the chart position of "Bring It All Back", the group felt "nervous and on-edge" before they discovered they had reached number one. Once they had received the phone call from the record company, the band celebrated the news with "cheers, shouting and crying". The group's success escalated and much like Fuller's marketing campaign for the Spice Girls, they were set to become a "marketable commodity". As evidence for this, global toy manufacturer Hasbro agreed upon an exclusive licensing agreement with 19 Management, which included worldwide rights in the fashion doll category; singing S Club 7 dolls were later released onto the market. An official magazine, fan club, and accompanying Miami 7 scrapbook were also launched furthering 19 Management's corporate aim.

Over the course of the year, the group enjoyed more success in the charts after their second single, "S Club Party", entered the UK chart at number two and went straight to number-one in New Zealand. Their third single was a double A-side and featured the ballad "Two in a Million", co-written by Cathy Dennis, and retro-styled, up-tempo "You're My Number One". The former was the first single where O'Meara took lead vocals, setting the standard for future S Club 7 releases; the single also reached number two on the UK Singles Chart. Following the success of their television show and released singles, the group released their debut album S Club in October 1999. The album quickly rose to number two on the UK Albums Chart, and then became certified Double Platinum. The album consisted of a variety of styles including Motown and salsa tracks.

Due to the increasing demand for the group with gruelling schedules including spending over thirteen weeks in America filming the first series of their show and their subsequent television specials, the members often felt that the travelling back and forth from the UK and the US was "perhaps more tiring than what we were actually going out to America to do". Paul Cattermole once commented that the speed of the schedule sometimes caused a "kind of dreamscape in your head", as the group often felt "jetlagged and tired". On top of the filming schedules, the group often performed at high-profile pop music festivals such as Party in the Park where they performed for 100,000 fans. The intensity of the schedule would be a constant battle for the group and was going to continue to take its toll for all the years S Club 7 were together. In spite of this, the group always remained in solidarity that they were all good friends, "cared for each other a lot" and supported each other through difficult times in the group.

Track listing

Charts

Weekly charts

Year-end charts

Certifications and sales

Notes

References

S Club 7 albums
1999 debut albums
Albums produced by Stargate
Interscope Records albums
Polydor Records albums